Fannin County is the name of two counties in the United States:

Fannin County, Georgia 
Fannin County, Texas